"Bet That" is the first single from Trick Daddy's seventh studio album Back by Thug Demand. The song was released in October 2006. It features Chamillionaire and Gold Ru$h. The song was produced by The Runners; who has produced for various artists including Rick Ross. It premiered on BET's 106 & Park where it was the New Joint of the day on October 30, 2006. The song peaked at No. 66 on the Billboard Hot R&B/Hip-Hop Songs chart. The remix features Ja Rule.

References 

2006 singles
2006 songs
Trick Daddy songs
Chamillionaire songs
Song recordings produced by the Runners
Songs written by Chamillionaire
Songs written by Trick Daddy
Music videos directed by Shane Drake
Atlantic Records singles
Songs written by Jermaine Jackson (hip hop producer)
Songs written by Andrew Harr